The Ministry of Liberation War Affairs (abbreviated as MoLWA) is the ministry responsible for the preservation of war memorials and the welfare of Freedom Fighters.

History
In 2016, the Bangladeshi cabinet rejected a proposal of the ministry to raise the retirement age of freedom fighters. Mozammel Haque called for a review of ties with Pakistan.

Directorate
 Bangladesh Freedom Fighter Welfare Trust
 National Freedom Fighter Council

References

 
Bangladesh Liberation War
Liberation War Affairs
Ministries established in 1971
1971 establishments in Bangladesh